Craig MacDonald may refer to:

 Craig MacDonald (ice hockey, born 1977), Canadian ice hockey left winger
Craig MacDonald, singer with The MacDonald Brothers

See also 
 Craig McDonald, American journalist and author